"Undone" is a song by New Zealand band Stellar*, released in November 2000 as the fourth single from their debut album, Mix (1999). The single includes the international version of "Violent"'s music video, directed by Jonathan King, as an extra element. "Undone" reached number 13 on New Zealand's RIANZ Singles Chart chart in January 2000 and charted for 12 weeks.

Background
According to bass player Kurt Shanks, "Undone" was the last song recorded for Mix. Before then, the band had never played the song together, and they tracked their instruments separately. Stellar* debuted the song in July 1999 at Queenstown's Winterfest.

Track listing
New Zealand CD single
 "Undone"
 "Undone" (Tapper's Delite mix)
 "Violent" (Filthy Lucre mix)
 "Violent" (video—international version)

Credits and personnel
Credits are lifted from the Stellar* website.

Studios
 Recorded at Revolver (Auckland, New Zealand)
 Mixed at Airforce (Auckland, New Zealand)
 Mastered at York Street (Auckland, New Zealand)

Personnel

 Boh Runga – writing
 Tom Bailey – production
 Stellar* – production
 Luke Tomes – programming, mixing, engineering
 Andrew Maclaren – programming
 Glen Cleaver – assistant engineering
 Jonathan King – video directing
 Gavin Botica – mastering

Charts

References

1999 singles
1999 songs
Epic Records singles
Songs written by Boh Runga
Stellar (New Zealand band) songs